The National Football League (NFL) regular season begins on the weekend following the first Monday of September (i.e, the weekend following the Labor Day holiday) and ends in early January, after which that season's playoffs tournament begins. It consists of 272 games, with each of the NFL's 32 teams playing 17 games during an 18-week period with one "bye" week off.

Since 2012, the NFL generally schedules games in five time slots during the week. The first game of the week is played on Thursday night, kicking off at 8:20 PM (ET). The majority of games are played on Sunday, most kicking off at 1PM (ET), with some late afternoon games starting at either 4:05 or 4:25 PM (ET). Additionally,  one Sunday night game is played every week at 8:20 PM (ET). Finally, one or two Monday night games then starts at 8:15 PM (ET). In addition to these regularly scheduled games, there are occasionally games at other times, such as a Saturday afternoon or evening, or the annual Thanksgiving Day games in which two daytime Thursday games are played in addition to the normal Thursday night game.

In place since 2006, the current broadcasting contract establishes broadcast partners for each game. The Sunday afternoon games are broadcast either on CBS or Fox. CBS has the broadcast rights for teams in the American Football Conference while Fox has the rights for teams in the National Football Conference.  In games where teams from both conferences play each other, the network with the broadcast rights for the "away" team will broadcast the game. In each local television market, three Sunday afternoon games are shown. One of the two networks shows two games back-to-back in each time slot, while the other network has the right to broadcast a single game, showing one game in either time slot; the networks generally alternate weeks (but not always) when each has the right to show both games. In addition to the regular Sunday afternoon games, there are three prime time games each week. The Thursday night game is broadcast by Amazon Prime Video. The Sunday night game is broadcast by NBC, while the Monday night game is broadcast by ESPN/ABC.

The NFL uses a strict scheduling algorithm to determine which teams play each other from year to year, based on the current division alignments and the final division standings from the previous season. The current formula has been in place since , the last year that the NFL expanded its regular season. Generally, each team plays the other three teams in its own division twice, all four teams from a single division in the AFC once, all four teams from a single division in the NFC once, two additional intraconference games, and one additional interconference game.

Game times

Since 1990, the majority of NFL regular-season games are played on Sundays at 1:00 pm, or around 4:05 to 4:25pm ET (see below). The late afternoon (ET) window is usually reserved for games hosted in the Pacific Time Zone or Mountain Time Zone, plus one or more marquee contests.  The current NFL television contract awards the American broadcast of these games to Fox or CBS, usually with Fox showing games where the visiting team is from the NFC, and CBS showing games where the visiting team is from the AFC. Each of these Sunday afternoon games is televised on a regional basis to a few or several areas around the country, therefore each viewer can only see a maximum two games at each window on broadcast, whereas the remaining games are exclusive to the NFL Sunday Ticket premium package.

Every Sunday of the regular season, either CBS or Fox air two games in a doubleheader package, while the other network may show only one game (with the exception of weeks 1 and 18 in which they both get a doubleheader). Late games scheduled to air on the network showing only one game are scheduled to start at 4:05pm ET, while the second game of a doubleheader will kick off later at 4:25pm; this is to reduce conflicts with 1:00pm games that have run late.

The schedule allows for four other regular time slots, in which these games are broadcast nationally across the country:
 One Sunday night game, which has been regularly scheduled since 1987, and has aired on NBC since 2006.
 One Monday Night Football game, which has been regularly scheduled since 1970, and has been appearing on ESPN since 2006. Also from 2006 to 2020, two games were on the first Monday of the season. The practice of holding a Monday night game during the last week of the season ended after the 2002 season due to low ratings and a competitive imbalance involved for potential playoff teams who would have one less day of rest before the postseason.  With the expansion of the season to 18 weeks in 2021, no Week 1 MNF doubleheader was scheduled that season.
 Since 2002, the league has also scheduled games on Thursday nights.  This is in addition to the Thanksgiving Day games traditionally hosted by Detroit (since 1920) and Dallas (since 1966).  Starting in 2002 the NFL Kickoff Game, traditionally hosted by the defending Super Bowl champions, has been held on the Thursday preceding the start of the rest of the games.  Since 2006, additional Thursday night games have been added to the season (with the games counting as part of the "week" including the upcoming Sunday), at first only after Thanksgiving, and since 2012, during nearly every week of the season.  
 Some late season games are played on Saturdays.  Due to the Sports Broadcasting Act of 1961, which prevents NFL and NCAA games from being played at the same time, these games are only played in December and January, after the conclusion of the NCAA regular season.  Some Saturday games have been a part of the schedule every season since 1970, except for 2013.

Since the 2006 season, the NFL has used a "flexible scheduling" system for the last seven weeks of the regular season when there is a Sunday night game. In 2014, that was expanded to include weeks 5 – 17.  This flexible scheduling allows for regional games originally scheduled for Sunday afternoon to be moved to the marquee Sunday Night matchup, to be broadcast to a national audience instead.

History

In its early years after , the NFL did not have a set schedule, and teams played as few as eight and as many as sixteen games, many against independent professional, college, or amateur teams. From  through , they played from eleven to fourteen games per season, depending on the number of teams in the league. From  through , each NFL team played 12 games per season. The American Football League began play in 1960 and introduced a balanced schedule of 14 games per team over a fifteen-week season, in which each of the eight teams played each of the other teams twice, with one bye week.

Also in 1961, the U.S. Congress passed the Sports Broadcasting Act in response to a court decision which ruled that the NFL's method of negotiating television broadcasting rights violated antitrust laws. The law allows the league to sell the rights to all regular season and postseason games to the networks, but prohibits the league from directly competing with high school and college football games. Since high school and college teams typically play games on Friday and Saturday, respectively, the NFL cannot hold games on those days until those seasons generally end in mid-December.

Opening weekend typically was the weekend after Labor Day, or rarely two weekends after Labor Day. Teams played six or seven exhibition games. In 1966 (and 1960), the NFL had an odd number of franchises,  so one team was idle each week. In , the league changed the schedule to include sixteen regular season games and four exhibition games. From 1978 through , the sixteen games were played over sixteen weeks.

The home games of the then-Baltimore Colts also typically kicked off at 2:00 pm ET due to Maryland's blue laws at the time. Since 1982, Central Time Zone games have primarily started at noon CT with the rest of the 1:00 p.m. ET early games. Baltimore Colts home games also moved to 4:00 p.m. ET with the rest of the late afternoon games until the team's relocation to Indianapolis in 1984. Maryland's blue laws were later modified, allowing the Baltimore Ravens to play their home games at 1:00 p.m. ET since their 1996 inaugural season.

In , the NFL re-introduced a bye week to the schedule, which it had not had since 1966. Each team played sixteen regular season games over seventeen weeks. During the season, on a rotating basis, each team would have the weekend off. As a result, opening weekend was moved up to Labor Day weekend. During that period, at least one team had to be given a bye on any given week. For the  season, the league experimented with the schedule by adding a second bye week for each team, resulting in an 18-week regular season. In 2001, the September 11th attacks resulted in the league postponing its week 2 games, leading to another 18-week season.

Since the  season, the league has scheduled a nationally televised regular season kickoff game on the Thursday night after Labor Day, prior to the first Sunday of NFL games to kick off the season. The first one, featuring the San Francisco 49ers and the New York Giants, was held on September 5, 2002 largely to celebrate New York City's resilience in the wake of the September 11, 2001 attacks. Since 2004, the NFL has indicated that the opening game will normally be hosted by the defending Super Bowl champions as the official start of their title defense.

Scheduling formula

Current formula

This chart of the 2022 season standings displays an application of the NFL scheduling formula. The Chiefs in 2022 (highlighted in green) finished in first place in the AFC West. Thus, in 2023, the Chiefs will play two games against each of its division rivals (highlighted in light blue), one game against each team in the AFC East and NFC North (highlighted in yellow), and one game each against the first-place finishers in the AFC North, AFC South (highlighted in orange) and NFC East (highlighted in pink).
Currently, the fourteen different opponents each team faces over the 17-game regular season schedule are set using a pre-determined formula:

 Each team plays twice against each of the other three teams in its division: once at home, and once on the road (six games).
 Each team plays once against each of the four teams from a predetermined division (based on a three-year rotation) within its own conference: two at home, and two on the road (four games).
 Each team plays once against one team from the remaining two divisions within its conference that finished in a similar placement in the final divisional standings in the prior season: one at home, one on the road (two games).
 Each team plays once against each of the four teams from a predetermined division (based on a four-year rotation) in the other conference: two at home, and two on the road (four games).
 Each team also plays one game against the team from a predetermined division (based on a four-year rotation) in the other conference that finished in a similar placement in the final divisional standings in the prior season (one game).

Under this formula, all teams are guaranteed to play every other team in their own conference at least once every three years, and to play every team in the other conference at least once every four years. The formula also guarantees a similar schedule for every team in a division each season, as all four teams will play fourteen out of their seventeen games against common opponents or each other.

Non-divisional intraconference match-ups can occur over consecutive years if two teams happen to finish in the same place consistently. For example, even though the Colts and Patriots are in different divisions within the same conference, the two teams played each other every season between 2003 and 2012, largely because both teams often finished in first place in their divisions each previous season. Similarly, the Jets and Browns played each other every season between 2015 and 2020 because both teams often landed in fourth place in their divisions.

Outside intradivisional match-ups (each of which is played twice-yearly), the home team for each match-up is also determined by the league according to a set rotation designed to largely alternate home and away designations over successive years. This rotation was slightly adjusted in 2010 for teams playing against the NFC West and AFC West, after several east-coast teams (such as the New England Patriots and New York Jets in ) all had to make four cross-country trips to play games in San Diego, San Francisco, Oakland, and Seattle in one season.

Although this scheduling formula determines each of the thirty-two teams' respective opponents, the league usually does not release the final regular schedule with specific dates and times until the spring; the NFL needs several months to coordinate the entire season schedule to align with various secondary objectives — such as accommodating various scheduling conflicts, not forcing teams to play too many consecutive games at home or on the road, avoiding giving any one team significantly more rest time than their opponent, and maximizing potential TV ratings. Since 2010, every regular season ends with only divisional match-ups in the final week, in an attempt to discourage playoff-bound teams from resting their starters and playing their reserves.

Past formulas

The only time between the merger in 1970 and 2002 (when the league was realigned into eight divisions of four teams each) that the league was completely "balanced" was in 1995 to 1998 (with six divisions of five teams each). When the league did not have equal numbers of teams in every division, every team's opposition could not be determined by the same means.

While teams playing against their division rivals twice each has been a tradition since at least the merger, not all teams would play the same amount of divisional games between the divisions due to the imbalances that had existed: the AFC Central between 1999 and 2001, consisting of six teams as a partial result of the Cleveland Browns relocation controversy, required teams to play ten intradivision games in a 16-game schedule.

From 1978 up to 2002, most teams always played four of the teams from a division in the other conference on a rotating basis (with certain exceptions differing between time periods), while lacking a rotary schedule within its own conference; this meant that while a team would be more likely to play every team in the other conference on a regular basis, they could go far longer without playing every team in their own.

For example, between 1970 (when the leagues merged) and 2002 (when the current schedule was introduced), the Denver Broncos and the Miami Dolphins played only six times, including a stretch where they met only once between 1976 and 1997.

This is an example of the formula used for determining opponents for teams that finished in last place in each of the five-team divisions between 1978 and 1994, when the league consisted of 28 teams playing 16 games each. The 1990 New England Patriots finished in last place in the AFC East.

This is an example of the formula used for determining a team's opponents between 1995 and 1998, when the league consisted of six divisions of five teams each. The 1996 San Francisco 49ers finished in 2nd place in the NFC West.

1995–1998 NFL scheduling formula
When the divisions were balanced between 1995 and 1998, each team would play a home and away series against their divisional rivals (8 games), two teams from each of the other divisions within the conference (two having finished the same place, and two others determined by where they placed in the standings), and four teams from a division in the other conference by the aforementioned rotary basis (where the team placed in the standings determines which team in the interconference division they will not play, and that team would have the "polar opposite" place (i.e.: 1st is the polar opposite of 5th) in their division), an example of which can be seen to the right.

1978–1994 NFL scheduling formula
The scheduling formula before 1995 was very similar, except in a modified format to fit not having fully balanced divisions. During these years, teams in five-team divisions who did not finish last would not normally face a 5th place team outside their division, whether or not those teams were intraconference. There was a special so-called "last place" or "fifth-place" schedule for teams who finished in last place in a five-team division. In addition to their division games, a team who finished in last place in the previous season would also primarily play the other teams who finished in last place in their respective divisions (the intraconference one would be played twice to fill a void otherwise taken by a third team that finished the same place), plus all the clubs in the four team division in their conference. An example of this is also shown to the right. The teams in a four-team division played only six divisional games, as opposed to the eight that teams in five-team divisions had played. This void would be filled by having to play against the 5th place teams in their conference in addition to their regular scheduling, hence tying to the "fifth-place" schedule.

Regular season expansion (2021–present)
Prior to the 2011 collective bargaining agreement (CBA), there had been proposals to expand the regular season schedule to 17 or 18 games per team. However, a longer regular season proposal was defeated in the 2011 labor negotiations between the owners and the players association.

One of the proposals for the 17th and 18th games was to have every team play at least one game abroad every year. Another idea put forth by Houston Texans owner Bob McNair before his death was to move the traditional regional rivalries that are currently played in the preseason (such as the Governor's Cups) into a permanent annual part of each NFL team's schedule. The NFL Players' Association opposed extending the season, largely because of injury concerns, and extending the season would require that such an extension be included in the next CBA. The collective bargaining agreement signed in 2011 maintained the sixteen game regular season schedule.

The 2020 CBA allowed for an expansion of the regular season to seventeen games. The team owners voted in March 2021 to institute the expanded schedule beginning with the 2021 season. Each team's 17th game will match them up against an interconference opponent from a division that specified team was not going to play against prior to the addition of the 17th game, with AFC teams hosting the extra games in odd-numbered years, while NFC teams host extra games in even-numbered years.

Scheduled division matchups
This chart displays the current schedule of division matchups, based on the three-year intraconference and four-year interconference rotations in place since 2002, and the additional interconference "17th game" in place since 2021. In each year, all four teams in each division listed at the top will play one game against all four teams in both of the divisions to which it has been assigned — one from the AFC, the other from the NFC.  In addition, every division is assigned to play its extra interconference game against one team from the division it played two years prior.

Regular season games played outside the U.S.

To date, several NFL regular season games have been played outside the U.S.  The first was the 2005 game between the Arizona Cardinals and the San Francisco 49ers, which was played in Mexico City.

In October 2006, NFL club owners approved a plan to stage up to two international regular season games per season beginning in 2007 and continuing through at least 2011. The New York Giants and the  Miami Dolphins  played at Wembley Stadium in London on October 28, 2007 for the first of these games. A second game in London took place on Sunday 26 October 2008, when the San Diego Chargers took on the nominal 'home team' New Orleans Saints, also at Wembley.  The New England Patriots were the designated visitors when they beat the Tampa Bay Buccaneers 35–7 on October 25, 2009.

The long term plan was originally to have two international games played every year, on a 16-year rotating schedule that would guarantee that each team would get to play twice over that span: once as the home team and once as the away team. This was abandoned when the St. Louis Rams, who are co-owned with Arsenal, a prominent soccer team in London, signed a three-year agreement to be the home team in the International Series games in London.  This plan has since been re-established after the Rams announced that they would not be returning to England in 2013; the Rams would return to London as host team in 2016.

Since, the NFL has announced that the Jacksonville Jaguars will play one home game a season at Wembley, up to and including 2016, later extended to 2020.  Their first game, versus the San Francisco 49ers, saw the 49ers winning comfortably.  A second game was played at Wembley for the first time, with the Minnesota Vikings hosting and beating the Pittsburgh Steelers. Meanwhile, a record three fixtures were announced from the 2014 season, with the Jacksonville Jaguars hosting the Dallas Cowboys, the Atlanta Falcons hosting the Detroit Lions and the Oakland Raiders hosting the Miami Dolphins at Wembley.

The Buffalo Bills played one regular season game each year from 2008 through 2013 in Toronto as part of the Bills Toronto Series; two preseason games were also played as part of the same series. Poor ticket sales, fan disgust in Buffalo and the death of Bills owner Ralph Wilson prompted the cancellation of the series in 2014.

From the 2022 season, each team will host at least one international game every eight years.

Disruptions of the schedule

Conflicts with other sports leagues and organizations
From the beginnings of the NFL, some teams shared stadiums with Major League Baseball teams, with the MLB teams holding leases giving them priority. The NFL was required to schedule around September baseball games. In October, this frequently resulted in NFL teams having to reschedule on short notice if the MLB team in their city made the playoffs. On some occasions, the NFL game could be moved to Saturday or Monday. The NFL would often schedule October division games so that teams would be able to swap home game dates if it appeared that the MLB playoff schedule would make a stadium unavailable to the NFL. Perhaps the most extreme case was in 1973, when the New York Jets played at Shea Stadium and were forced to play their first six games on the road, even being forced to move a home game against the Steelers from New York to Pittsburgh, due to the Mets playing in the World Series.

As more MLB teams started to move into baseball-only stadiums by the 1990s and 2000s, this became less of a problem. Since 2020 there are no stadiums shared by MLB and NFL teams, with the move of the Raiders from Oakland to Las Vegas. Additionally, five NFL teams currently share a venue with a Major League Soccer team: the New England Patriots share Gillette Stadium with the New England Revolution, the Seattle Seahawks share Lumen Field with the Seattle Sounders FC, the Atlanta Falcons share Mercedes-Benz Stadium with Atlanta United FC, the Chicago Bears share Soldier Field with the Chicago Fire FC, and the Carolina Panthers share Bank of America Stadium with Charlotte FC. However, there are some NFL and MLB venues that share parking lots, and as such the NFL typically schedules teams to play on the road when their MLB counterpart is at home. The following teams play in close proximity to MLB stadiums:
 Baltimore Ravens (close to Oriole Park at Camden Yards, home of the Baltimore Orioles)
 Cincinnati Bengals (close to Great American Ballpark, home of the Cincinnati Reds)
 Dallas Cowboys (close to Globe Life Field, home of the Texas Rangers)
 Detroit Lions (close to Comerica Park, home of the Detroit Tigers)
 Kansas City Chiefs (close to Kauffman Stadium, home of the Kansas City Royals)
 Philadelphia Eagles (close to Citizens Bank Park, home of the Philadelphia Phillies)
 Pittsburgh Steelers (close to PNC Park, home of the Pittsburgh Pirates)
 Seattle Seahawks (close to T-Mobile Park, home of the Seattle Mariners)

While both the NFL and MLB teams play in downtown stadiums in Cleveland, Denver and Minneapolis, the teams do not share the same parking lots as they play in different parts of the downtown area. As such, it is possible for the Browns, Broncos and Vikings to play home games on the same day the Guardians, Rockies and Twins, respectively, play at home.

In , the Super Bowl XLVII champion Baltimore Ravens were forced to open on the road due to this fact, as their MLB counterparts, the Baltimore Orioles, were scheduled at home on the same day as the Week 1 NFL Kickoff game and declined to either reschedule or relocate their game. (MLB typically releases the schedule for an upcoming season prior to the end of the previous season, forcing the NFL to accommodate the scheduling needs of teams who share parking lots or stadiums with MLB teams, while MLS typically releases their season schedule well ahead of the NFL's schedule release.) The Super Bowl XLVIII champion Seattle Seahawks averted this conflict for the  season opener, as their MLB counterparts, the Seattle Mariners, played on the road; their respective venues also share the same parking lot. The Seattle Sounders FC also played on the road during the opening week of the 2014 NFL season, assuring no scheduling conflicts. The Buffalo Bills also hosted one game a year at the Rogers Centre, which is the home of the Toronto Blue Jays, but this was only an issue in the preseason, since all such regular season games were scheduled after the end of the MLB World Series.

NFL teams have also shared stadiums with NCAA college football teams and bowl games, either temporarily or permanently, but the Sports Broadcasting Act of 1961 prohibits the NFL from scheduling games on the same days as college football games.

Labor disputes
The 1982 and 1987 seasons were both shortened by labor disputes. The 1982 strike lasted 57 days. Weeks 3 through 10 were canceled, but an additional week was added to make a 9-game schedule. The 1982 playoff matchups were determined by conference standings only.  The 1987 strike and subsequent lockout lasted 24 days but only one week of the schedule was lost.  Weeks 4 through 6 were played with non-union replacement players.  The rest of the season was played as originally scheduled, for a total of 15 games per team.

In the event that the  season had been disrupted because of a then-ongoing labor dispute, the NFL had arranged its schedule to facilitate easier cancellations and postponements. In addition to an emergency scenario of an eight-game schedule beginning in late November, the NFL also arranged its full-length schedule such that weeks 2 and 4 had no division games and all week 3 matchups could be moved into each team's respective bye week. The league also had a contingency plan to postpone Super Bowl XLVI one week, which (assuming a full playoff schedule, but eliminating the bye-week before the Super Bowl and moving the Super Bowl back one week) would allow a 14-game schedule with all six division games for each team to be played beginning as late as October 16.

Natural disasters
Several games have been postponed or relocated because of natural disasters. In 1989, Candlestick Park was damaged by the Loma Prieta earthquake. The San Francisco 49ers would play their game on October 22, 1989 against the New England Patriots at Stanford Stadium in Palo Alto. A few days before the start of the 2005 NFL Season, the Louisiana Superdome was severely damaged by Hurricane Katrina, and much of the city of New Orleans was destroyed.  The New Orleans Saints' eight scheduled home games were moved to other locations, including Giants Stadium, the Alamodome in San Antonio, and Tiger Stadium on the campus of Louisiana State University. On September 14, 2008, the Houston Texans were scheduled to host the Baltimore Ravens. The game was postponed until November 9 because of Hurricane Ike (which caused some damage to Reliant Stadium) and several other changes had to be made to the schedule. The roof of the Hubert H. Humphrey Metrodome collapsed on December 12, 2010 after a severe heavy snowstorm, resulting in the stadium being unusable for the remainder of the season. The last two of the Minnesota Vikings' home games had to be moved: one to Ford Field in Detroit (which also led to the game being postponed the following Monday night) and another to TCF Bank Stadium, the University of Minnesota's college football stadium. On August 29, 2021, Hurricane Ida made landfall in Louisiana, causing severe damage to New Orleans; the New Orleans Saints' season opener against the Green Bay Packers, scheduled for September 12 at the Superdome, was moved to TIAA Bank Field in Jacksonville, Florida.

The Miami Dolphins have been involved in a number of games that were moved to a different time and date. A few of those games would include 1992 against the New England Patriots (Hurricane Andrew), 2004 against the Tennessee Titans (Hurricane Ivan) and the Pittsburgh Steelers (Hurricane Jeanne), 2005 against the Kansas City Chiefs (Hurricane Wilma), 2017 against the Tampa Bay Buccaneers (Hurricane Irma), and others. In December 2010, a Minnesota Vikings–Philadelphia Eagles game originally scheduled for the afternoon of Sunday, December 26, a time at which it could have been successfully completed, had two weeks earlier been flexed by NBC to Sunday night and was postponed to Tuesday, December 28, due to a strong Nor'easter.
In 2014, the Week 12 visit of the Jets to Buffalo was moved to Detroit (and from Sunday to Monday) due to severe snow in Western New York the previous week.

Other major news events
The American Football League, the precursor to today's American Football Conference, postponed Week 12 of the 1963 season because of the assassination of President Kennedy, on Friday, November 22.  The AFL's games were made up by adding a 15th week to a 14-week schedule. The older and more established National Football League went ahead and played as scheduled on Sunday, November 24, 1963.

In , Week 2 of the season was postponed because of the September 11 attacks.  At the end of the originally planned 17-week schedule, Week 2 games were played on Sunday, January 6 and Monday, January 7, 2002. The post-season schedule was moved back a week, including Super Bowl XXXVI to preserve the bye week before the game; since 2021, the Super Bowl is played on the second Sunday in February.

In , the league added contingencies in its schedule similar to those made for the labor dispute in 2011 in case the season had to be delayed because of the COVID-19 pandemic.  Every game in Week 2 featured teams that shared the same bye week later in the season, which would have allowed these games to be made up on the teams' original byes. Weeks 3 and 4 were set up so that there were no divisional games and that every team at home in Week 3 was away in Week 4 and vice versa. This would have allowed the NFL to cancel these two weeks without eliminating any divisional games and keeping each team's home and away games balanced. These scheduling changes, along with eliminating the week off before the Super Bowl and moving the Super Bowl back three weeks, would have allowed the NFL to play a 14-game schedule beginning October 29 while still playing the Super Bowl in February.

See also
 List of National Football League seasons
 NFL preseason
 NFL playoffs
 Major League Baseball schedule
 Season structure of the NHL

Notes

References

National Football League
Moveable holidays (US Labor Day date based)